The 1922 Chicago Bears season was their third regular season completed in the National Football League, which changed its name from the APFA, and the first under the new franchise name.  The team changed the name from Staleys to Bears because Halas wanted his football franchise's nickname to reflect that of the team whose field he used, that being the Chicago Cubs.

The team was unable to improve on their 9–1–1 record from 1921 and finished with a 9–3 record under head coach/player George Halas, earning them a second-place finish in the team standings, the second time in the last three years. Two of the three losses were to the Chicago Cardinals, both shutouts suffered "away" at Comiskey Park where the Cardinals played their home games. The other loss was to eventual NFL champion Canton Bulldogs. In none of their other games were the Bears seriously challenged, with most either shutouts or relative blowouts. Ed "Dutch" Sternaman led the Bears in scoring for the third straight season, with three touchdowns, 6 field goals, and 5 PATs, finishing with 41 points. His brother Joe Sternaman joined the team and starred by scoring 5 touchdowns and adding 2 PATs.

Future Hall of Fame players
 George Halas, end
 Ed Healey, tackle (from Rock Island)
 George Trafton, center

Other leading players
 Ed Sternaman, back
 Joe Sternaman, quarterback (rookie from Illinois)
 Laurie Walquist, quarterback (rookie from Illinois)

Departed players from 1920
 Guy Chamberlin, End (went to Canton)

Schedule

Standings

References

Chicago Bears
Chicago Bears seasons
Chicago Bears